Kangra Assembly constituency is 16th of the 68 assembly constituencies of Himachal Pradesh an Indian state. Kangra is also part of Kangra Lok Sabha constituency.

Members of Legislative Assembly

Election candidate

2022

Election results

2017

See also
 List of constituencies of the Himachal Pradesh Legislative Assembly
 Kangra, Himachal Pradesh
 Kangra district

References

External links
 

Kangra district
Assembly constituencies of Himachal Pradesh